The Hong Kong Special Administrative Region (HKSAR), can be geographically divided into three territories: Kowloon, Hong Kong Island, and the New Territories. Hong Kong is a coastal city and major port in Southern China, bordering Guangdong province through the city of Shenzhen to the north and the South China Sea to the west, east and south. Hong Kong and its 260 territorial islands and peninsulas are located at the mouth of the Pearl River Delta. The area of Hong Kong is distinct from Mainland China, but is considered part of "Greater China".

Lantau Island and the majority of the remaining islands are part of the New Territories, an area that also encompasses the hilly terrain north of Kowloon. Hong Kong Island is separated from Kowloon by Victoria Harbour, a natural landform harbour. The Kowloon Peninsula to the south of Boundary Street and the New Territories to the north of Hong Kong Island were added to Colonial Hong Kong in 1860 and 1898, respectively. 

Further from Victoria Harbour and the coast, the landscape of Hong Kong is fairly hilly to mountainous with steep slopes. The highest point in the territory is Tai Mo Shan, at a height of 958 metres in the New Territories. Lowlands exist in the northwestern part of the New Territories. Portions of land in the New Territories and Hong Kong island are reserved as country parks and nature reserves.

With the fourth highest population density of countries and dependencies in the world at 6,300 people per square kilometer, Hong Kong is known for its shortage of residential space. Hong Kong has undergone several land reclamation projects to provide more space for residential and economic purposes, increasing its land area. This has caused the distance between Hong Kong Island and Kowloon to decrease. Hong Kong International Airport is the sole public airport in the territory, and is mostly located on reclaimed land on the island of Chek Lap Kok.

Politically, Hong Kong is divided into 18 districts, each having a district council. Nevertheless, most public services operate across the territory, and travel between the districts is not restricted. Sha Tin is the most populous district as of 2019.

The name "Hong Kong", literally meaning "fragrant harbour", is derived from the area around present-day Aberdeen on Hong Kong Island, where fragrant wood products and incense were once traded. The narrow body of water separating Hong Kong Island and Kowloon Peninsula, Victoria Harbour, is one of the deepest natural maritime ports in the world.

Hong Kong and Macau are connected through the Hong Kong–Zhuhai–Macau Bridge.

Climate

Hong Kong's climate is subtropical and monsoonal with cool dry winters and hot and wet summers. It is occasionally affected by tropical cyclones between May and November, most often from July to September.

January and February are cloudier, with occasional cold fronts followed by dry northerly winds. It is not uncommon for temperatures to drop below  in urban areas. Sub-zero temperatures and frost occur at times on high ground and in the New Territories. March and April can be pleasant although there are occasional spells of high humidity. Fog and drizzle are common on high ground which is exposed to the southeast. May to August are hot and humid with occasional showers and thunderstorms. In November and December there are pleasant breezes, plenty of sunshine and comfortable temperatures.

Geographical information

Location

It is surrounded by the South China Sea on all sides except the north, which neighbours the Guangdong city of Shenzhen along the Sham Chun River. The territory's  area consists of Hong Kong Island, the Kowloon Peninsula, the New Territories, Lantau Island, and over 200 other islands. Urban development is concentrated on the Kowloon Peninsula, Hong Kong Island, and in new towns throughout the New Territories. Much of this is built on reclaimed land, due to the lack of developable flat land;  (six per cent of the total land or about 25 per cent of developed space in the territory) is reclaimed from the sea.

Undeveloped terrain is hilly to mountainous, with very little flat land, and consists mostly of grassland, woodland, shrubland, or farmland. About 40 per cent of the remaining land area is country parks and nature reserves. The territory has a diverse ecosystem; over 3,000 species of vascular plants occur in the region (300 of which are native to Hong Kong), and thousands of insect, avian, and marine species.

Land boundaries
Total: Border city: Shenzhen Special Economic Zone, Guangdong Province
Figures published by the United States Central Intelligence Agency

Coastline
Total: Maritime claims:
Territorial sea: Figures published by the United States Central Intelligence Agency

Islands

Terrain
Hong Kong's terrain is hilly and mountainous with steep slopes. There are lowlands in the northern part of Hong Kong. A significant amount of land in Hong Kong, especially on the Hong Kong Island and the Kowloon peninsula, is reclaimed.

Extreme points

The lowest elevation in Hong Kong is in the South China Sea (0 m) while the highest elevation is at Tai Mo Shan in Tsuen Wan, the New Territories.

Land
Northernmost: Sham Chun River 
Easternmost: Ping Chau (aka. Tung Ping Chau) 
Southernmost: Tau Lo Chau 
Westernmost: Peaked Hill

Principal peaks of Hong Kong

 Tai Mo Shan - , Tsuen Wan
 Lantau Peak (Fung Wong Shan) -  on Lantau Island
 Sunset Peak (Tai Tung Shan) - , on Lantau Island
 Sze Fong Shan - 
 Lin Fa Shan - , on Lantau Island
 Nei Lak Shan - , on Lantau Island
 Yi Tung Shan - , on Lantau Island
 Ma On Shan - 
 The Hunch Backs (Ngau Ngak Shan) - 
 Grassy Hill - 
 Wong Leng - 
 Buffalo Hill - 
 West Buffalo Hill - 
 Kowloon Peak (Fei Ngo Shan) - 
 Shun Yeung Fung - 
 Tiu Shau Ngam - 
 Kai Kung Leng - 
 Castle Peak - 
 Lin Fa Shan, Tsuen Wan - 
 Tate's Cairn (Tai Lo Shan) - 

Natural resources
The natural resources of Hong Kong can be divided into three main categories:

Metalliferous minerals and non-metalliferous industrial minerals in the onshore area;
Quarried rock and building stone;
Offshore sand deposits.

Despite its small size, Hong Kong has a relatively large number of mineral occurrences. Some mineral deposits have been exploited commercially. Metalliferous mineral occurrences are grouped into four broad categories: tin-tungsten-molybdenum mineralisation, copper-lead-zinc mineralisation, iron mineralisation and placer deposits of tin and gold. Mesozoic igneous activity is largely responsible for this diversity of mineral deposits and the mineral concentrations have been variably enhanced by hydrothermal activity associated with faulting. Concentrations of non-metalliferous minerals that have been commercially exploited include kaolin clay, feldspar, quartz, beryl and graphite.

For many years, granite and volcanic rocks have been quarried locally for road base metal, riprap, armour stone and asphalt, although the main purpose now is for concrete aggregates. At present, there are three quarries operating in Hong Kong. These are principally in granite and are located at Lam Tei, Shek O and Anderson Road. All the quarries are in the process of rehabilitation and have a life expectancy of between two and eight years.

Offshore sand bodies have been dredged for aggregate sand and reclamation fill in Hong Kong as the rate of urban development has increased.

Additional natural resources include forest and wildlife.

Land use
Arable land: 2.95%
Permanent crops: 0.95%
Other: 96.10% (2012 est.)
Figures published by the United States Central Intelligence Agency
Big 22

Natural hazards
Tropical cyclones are frequent in Hong Kong during the summer months between June and August. Landslides are common after rainstorms.

Environmental issues

Air and water pollution from rapid urbanisation
Extinction of natural species
Introduction of exotic species

See also

 Conservation in Hong Kong
 Beaches of Hong Kong
 List of rivers and nullahs in Hong Kong
 List of bays in Hong Kong
 List of places in Hong Kong
 Sandbars in Hong Kong
 Geology of Hong Kong
 Origins of names of cities and towns in Hong Kong
 Geography of China
 Geography of Macau
 Pratas Island, Taiwan (ROC), located in the Hong Kong FIR

References

External links
 Climate of Hong Kong
 The Lands Department of the Government of Hong Kong
 "Hong Kong in Figures 2006 Edition",
 "Hong Kong Map"
Census and Statistics Department, HKSAR. February 2006.

 
Hong Kong
.Hong Kong
Hong Kong